is a Japanese manga series written and illustrated by Jun Abe. It has been serialized in Shogakukan's seinen manga magazine Weekly Big Comic Spirits since August 2014. It was adapted into a 12-episode television drama broadcast on TV Tokyo from October to December 2018.

Media

Manga
Bōkyaku no Sachiko, written and illustrated by Jun Abe, started in Shogakukan's seinen manga magazine Weekly Big Comic Spirits on August 11, 2014. Shogakukan has collected its chapters into individual tankōbon volumes. The first volume was released on December 26, 2014. As of May 30, 2022, eighteen volumes have been released.

Volume list

Drama
A television drama special, starring Mitsuki Takahata as Sachiko Sasaki, aired on TV Tokyo on January 2, 2018. A 12-episode drama aired on TV Tokyo from October 13 to December 29, 2018. Another special aired on TV Tokyo on January 2, 2020.

Reception
Bōkyaku no Sachiko ranked 3rd on the first annual Tsutaya Comic Awards' Next Break Division in 2017.

Notes

References

External links
  
  

Comedy anime and manga
Cooking in anime and manga
Seinen manga
Shogakukan manga
TV Tokyo original programming